The 2006 Stockholm municipal election was held on 17 September 2006, concurrently with the 2006 Swedish general election.  The election determined how many seats each party would be allocated on the 101-member Stockholm city council (Stockholms kommunfullmäktige) thorough a system of proportional representation.  A total of 490,869 votes were cast in this election, for a total voter turnout of 79.1%

Opinion polling

Results

References
 Swedish Television 
 Opinion polling: "DN/Synovate: Stockholmsopinionen"

See also
 Elections in Sweden
 List of political parties in Sweden
 City of Stockholm

Municipal elections in Stockholm
2006 elections in Sweden
2000s in Stockholm
September 2006 events in Europe